The UK Sports Network, historically known as the Big Blue Sports Network (BBSN) and also formerly known as the UK IMG Sports Network, is the radio and television network of the University of Kentucky Wildcats men's and women's sports teams. It consists of seven over-the-air television affiliates, two regional sports networks, and 44 radio stations in Kentucky and neighboring states.

Except for the Blue/White game, beginning in the 2012–2013 season, all men's basketball broadcasts on Fox Sports South began to be produced by Fox Sports, using their graphics and music.

History
The radio network was established in September 1968 for the purpose of broadcasting football and basketball games to select radio stations across the state of Kentucky. Prior to this, individual stations in central Kentucky each held their own coverage of the games. The original group rightsholder was Host Communications. Later on, the broadcast syndicator of the UK Sports Network was Sports Productions, a joint venture of Host Communications, CBS television affiliate WKYT-TV of Lexington, and radio stations WVLK of Lexington and WHAS of Louisville. Cawood Ledford and Ralph Hacker were the first play-by-play commentators for the network.

In 2007, HOST Communications, a college sports marketing company based in the university's home city of Lexington, that had operated the Big Blue Sports Network, was purchased by the entertainment management company IMG. However, the name of the network did not change until the 2010–11 academic year.

Sale of media rights to JMI Sports
On June 23, 2014, University of Kentucky Athletic Director Mitch Barnhart announced that JMI Sports, owned by former San Diego Padres owner John Moores, had been awarded the multimedia rights to all University of Kentucky sports teams. UK's contract with JMI Sports was to initially begin upon the expiration of the university's contract with IMG College in April 2015. The university's contract with JMI include:
 Radio rights to UK's football, men's and women's basketball and baseball games (Television rights are covered by Southeastern Conference broadcasting arrangements, including the SEC Network);
 Stadium and arena corporate signage and game programs for all home UK events. (Prior to 2018, Rupp Arena corporate signage was managed by Learfield Sports (Rupp Arena Sports and Entertainment Properties) under a contract with the Lexington Center Corporation (LCC), who manages the arena for the Lexington-Fayette Urban County Government. In 2018, control of all multimedia rights for the Lexington Center (including Rupp Arena), including naming rights, were turned over to the university, who subsequently awarded those rights to JMI.);
 Naming rights to university athletics facilities and premium areas;
 Sponsorship on UKathletics.com;
 Game sponsorships and game promotions;
 Coaches' endorsements;
 Pre and postgame television shows and specials and postseason highlight DVDs;
 Video features on video boards;
 Opportunities to develop UK Athletics Corporate Partnership Program; and
 The potential, at the university's discretion, to market campus multimedia rights, creating the potential for an integrated approach to multimedia rights and marketing.

On October 27, 2014, JMI Sports announced that they had bought out the final year of IMG's contract with the University of Kentucky. As part of that agreement with IMG, JMI immediately took over management of the entire University of Kentucky's Sports Marketing program, including the UK Sports Network.

On January 27, 2020, it was announced that Lexington Center's overall naming rights were sold to Central Bank, a local community bank, by the Lexington Center Corporation and JMI Sports. The Rupp name will continue to receive primacy in the fourteen-year agreement for the arena portion of the complex, and be known as "Rupp Arena at Central Bank Center".

On-air personalities

Current
Tom Leach – play-by-play commentator (Football 1997–present, Men's Basketball, 2001–present)

Former
Claude Sullivan, play-by-play commentator (men's basketball and football 1948–1967)
Cawood Ledford, play-by-play commentator (1953–1992)
Ralph Hacker – color analyst (1973–1993), play-by-play commentator (men's basketball 1993–2001, football 1993–1997)
JB Faulconer, play by play commentator (1944–1953) men’s basketball (Rupp) Men’s football (Bryant)
Neil Price – play-by-play commentator (Women's Basketball, 2005–2017)
Mike Pratt – color analyst (men's basketball and football 2001–2022)

Over-the air television affiliates

Current

Former

Regional sports networks

Radio
All listed radio stations are sorted by city of license. Areas served by these stations will vary. Most affiliates air coverage of football and men's basketball, unless otherwise specified.

Notable former affiliates

See also
Vol Network, the Tennessee statewide network of the Tennessee Volunteers, Kentucky's southern neighbor.

References

College basketball on the radio in the United States
College football on the radio
Kentucky Wildcats
University of Kentucky
Sports radio networks in the United States